Purple giant hyssop is a common name for several plants and may refer to:

Agastache rugosa, native to eastern Asia
Agastache scrophulariifolia, native to North America